Beegum Peak is a summit in the U.S. state of California.

Beegum Peak was so named on account of its shape, likened to a beehive; "beegum" is a Southern word for "beehive". A variant name is "Bee Gum Butte".

References

Mountains of Tehama County, California
Mountains of Northern California